Dwelah is a village in Diyala Governorate, Iraq, approximately 45 miles north of Baghdad.

2007 militant attack 
Dwelah is best known for being the location of a December 1, 2007 militant attack. Around 6:30 a.m., 50 to 60 suspected al-Qaida fighters showered a Shiite village with mortar rounds. Soon afterward, they began torching homes and forcing hundreds of families to flee. The death toll of the village is currently at 16 dead: 9 men, 2 women, and  3 children. In addition, 3 militants died in the fighting, after Dwelahns fought back.

References 

Populated places in Diyala Province